Precigen, Inc (formerly Intrexon Corporation, NASDAQ: PGEN) is an American biotechnology company. Its president and CEO is Helen Sabzevari.

Intrexon was founded in 1998, and is headquartered in Germantown, Maryland. With a suite of proprietary and complementary technologies, Intrexon applies engineering to biological systems to enable DNA-based control over the function and output of living cells.

History 
In 2015, Intrexon purchased Oxitec, a maker of genetically sterile insects, for $160 million. In April 2019, Intrexon formed a subsidiary called Precigen, with a focus on human gene therapy. Precigen went on to win orphan drug status from the FDA for a CAR-T based therapy (investigational drug name PRGN-3006) to treat acute myeloid leukemia. In early 2020, Intrexon adopted the name of its subsidiary, Precigen, and narrowed its focus to human gene editing. With the change in name the CEO of subsidiary Precigen, Helen Sabzevari, took over leadership of the company from Randal J. Kirk.

See also
 Amyris
 Ginkgo Bioworks
 Zymergen

References

External links

American companies established in 1998
Biotechnology companies of the United States
Companies based in Maryland